The Isle of Man is an island in the Irish Sea, between Great Britain and Ireland in Northern Europe, with a population of almost 85,000. It is a British Crown dependency. It has a small islet, the Calf of Man, to its south.

Dimensions

Area:

Land:

Water:
 (100 ha)
Total:

This makes it:
slightly more than three times the size of Washington, DC
slightly more than one third the size of Hertfordshire
slightly smaller than Saint Lucia.

Coast and Territorial Sea
The total territorial sea area is about 4000 km2 or 1500 sq miles, which is about 87% of the total area of the jurisdiction of the Isle of Man. The Isle of Man only holds exclusive fishing rights in the first 3 nm. The territorial sea is managed by the Isle of Man Government Department of Infrastructure.

The Raad ny Foillan long-distance footpath runs  around the Manx coast.

Climate
The Isle of Man enjoys a temperate climate, with cool summers and mild winters. Average rainfall is high compared to the majority of the British Isles, due to its location to the western side of Great Britain and sufficient distance from Ireland for moisture to be accumulated by the prevailing south-westerly winds. Average rainfall is highest at Snaefell, where it is around  a year. At lower levels it can fall to around  a year.

Temperatures remain fairly cool, with the recorded maximum being  at Ronaldsway.

Terrain 

The island's terrain is varied. There are two mountainous areas divided by a central valley which runs between Douglas and Peel. The northern end of the island is a flat plain, consisting of glacial tills and marine sediments. To the south the island is more hilly, with distinct valleys. There is no land below sea level.

Land use 
Arable land: 43.86%
Permanent crops: 0%
Other: 56.14% (includes permanent pastures, forests, mountain and heathland) (2011)

Natural hazards and environmental issues
There are few severe natural hazards, the most common being high winds, rough seas and dense fog. In recent years there has been a marked increase in the frequency of high winds, heavy rains, summer droughts and flooding both from heavy rain and from high seas. Snow fall has decreased significantly over the past century while temperatures are increasing year round with rainfall decreasing.

Air pollution, marine pollution and waste disposal are issues in the Isle of Man.

Protected or recognised sites for nature conservation
In order of importance, international first, non-statutory last. Note that ASSIs and MNRs have equal levels of statutory protection under the Wildlife Act 1990.

UNESCO Biosphere Reserves 
The entire territory of the Isle of Man, including all land, sea, freshwater, airspace and seabed is a UNESCO Biosphere Reserve

Ramsar sites 

Designated:
Ballaugh Curraghs (2006, 193.4 ha).  Shares an identical boundary to the Ballaugh Curraghs ASSI.

Candidate:
The Ayres (Proposed in 2004 & 2005, 600 ha) 
Southern Coasts & Calf of Man (Proposed in 2004 & 2005, 2326 ha) 
Central Valley Curragh (Proposed in 2004 & 2005, 164 ha) 
Gob ny Rona, Maughold Head & Port Cornaa (Proposed in 2004 & 2005, 209 ha) 
Dalby Peatlands (Proposed in 2004 & 2005, 58 ha)

Important Bird Areas 

The UK RSPB and UK JNCC have designated five areas of the Isle of Man which are of global significance to birdlife.

Isle of Man Sea Cliffs - 97 km of the east and west coasts
Calf of Man - 250ha
The Ayres - c800ha
Ballaugh Curraghs - 374ha
Isle of Man Hills - 8650ha

National Nature Reserves 
The Ayres (2000, 272 ha)

Areas of Special Scientific Importance 
There are 25 ASSIs on the Isle of Man as of November 2022.  One additional ASSI has been designated but later rescinded (Ramsey Estuary).  Dates below refer to year of formal confirmation.

Ballachurry Meadows (2010, 11.9 ha)
Ballacrye Meadow (2005, 0.55 ha)
Ballateare Meadow (2014, 0.96 ha)
Ballaugh Curraghs (2005, 193.4 ha)
Central Ayres (1996, 259.66 ha, extended 2008 by 98.68 ha, total 358.35 ha)
Cronk y Bing (2006, 17.71 ha)
Cronk y King (2014, extended in 2021 to 3.02 ha)
Curragh Pharrick (2022, 4.02 ha)
Dalby Coast (2010, 62.1 ha)
Dhoon Glen (2007, 20.92 ha)
Douglas Head (2022)
Eary Vane (2007, 3.96 ha)
Glen Maye (2008, 15.92 ha)
Glen Rushen (2007, 12.27 ha)
Greeba Mountain & Central Hills (2009, 1,080.95 ha)
Grenaby Gareys (2021, 74.82 ha)
Jurby Airfield (2005, 63.04 ha)
Langness, Derbyhaven & Sandwick (2001, 310 ha)
Marine Drive (2021, 82.35 ha)
Maughold Cliffs & Brooghs (2011, 53.63 ha)
Port St Mary Ledges & Kallow Point (2011, 14.79 ha)
Poyll Vaaish Coast (2007, 44.76 ha) 
Ramsey Estuary (designated but later rescinded in 2010 - 15.8 ha)
Ramsey Mooragh Shore (2006, 2.65 ha)
Rosehill Quarry, Billown (2006, 1.37 ha)
Santon Gorge & Port Soldrick (2012, 24.35 ha)

Marine Nature Reserves 

A marine nature reserve was designated in Ramsey Bay in Oct 2011. In 2018 nine further Marine Nature Reserves were given statutory protection. The ten Marine Nature Reserves found around the Isle of Man cover over 10% of the country's territorial waters, in accordance with international requirements.
Ramsey Bay 2011
Baie ny Carrickey 2018
Calf and Wart Bank 2018
Douglas Bay 2018
Langness 2018
Laxey Bay 2018
Little Ness 2018
Niarbyl Bay 2018
Port Erin Bay 2018
West Coast 2018

Areas of Special Protection 
Ayres Gravel Pit designated 2001, 4 hectares. In 2019 this became a nature reserve managed by Manx BirdLife.

Bird Sanctuaries 
Bird Sanctuaries where formerly designated under the Wild Birds Protection Act 1932.  This designation was superseded by Areas of Special Protection for Birds by the Wildlife Act 1990, however the following formerly designated Bird Sanctuaries remain protected:

'Barnell Reservoir (Patrick)' (1979) 0.02 km2
'Tynwald National Park and Arboretum' (1982) 
'Langness, Derbyhaven, Langness and Fort Island and foreshores adjoining' (1936) 
'Renscault and Ballachrink (West Baldwin)' (1978) 0.18 km2
'The Willows (Ballamodha, Malew)' (1984) 0.01 km2

Nature Reserves and Wildlife Sites

Manx Wildlife Trust Reserves
The Manx Wildlife Trust was founded on 6th March 1973 and (as of March 2023) manages 26 nature reserves, along with the Calf of Man (on behalf of Manx National Trust). These reserves total , or 0.68% of the Isle of Man and include:

Aust, acquired 2016, 
Ballachrink part of the Renscault & Ballachrink Bird Sanctuary, acquired 2011, 
Ballachurry, acquired 2016, 
Ballamoar Meadow, acquired 1994, 
Barnell Reservoir, part of the Ballamoar Bird Sanctuary, acquired 1974 & 1984, 
Breagle Glen and Cronk Aash, acquired 1988, 1991 & 2010, 
Calf of Man, owned by Manx National Trust, managed by Manx Wildlife Trust since 2005, 
Close-e-Quayle, acquired 1994 & 2003, 
Close Sartfield, acquired 1987, part of the Ballaugh Curraghs ASSI and Ramsar Site
Close Umpson, acquired 1995, part of the Ballaugh Curraghs ASSI and Ramsar Site
Cooildarry, acquired 1976 & 1979, 
Cronk-y-Bing ASSI, acquired 1989, 
Curragh Feeagh, acquired 1986, 
Curragh Kionedroghad (Onchan Wetlands), acquired 1988 & 1990, 
Dalby Mountain Moorland, acquired 1995, 
Dalby Mountain Fields, acquired 1995, 
Dobbie's Meadow, acquired 2013, 
Earystane, acquired 1998, 
Fell's Field, acquired 1998, 
Glen Dhoo, acquired 1995, 
Goshen, acquired 1995, 1998 & 2008, part of Ballaugh Curraghs ASSI Ramsar Site
Hairpin Woodland Park, acquired 2019 & 2022, 
Lough Cranstal, acquired 1989 & 2022, 
Lough Gat-e-Whing, acquired 2016, 
Miss Gyler's Meadow, acquired 1989, 
Moaney & Crawyn's Meadows, acquired 1995, part of the Ballaugh Curraghs ASSI and Ramsar Site
Mullen-e-Cloie, acquired 2008,

Designated Wildlife Sites
The Isle of Man has (as of March 2023) 92 non-statutory 'Wildlife Sites' sites covering 1230.54 ha (3040.73ac) in addition to the 10.4 km of coastline. As of 30 January 2009 this total was 45 wildlife sites, covering about 195 ha of land and an additional  of inter-tidal coast. Wildlife Sites are not recognised in law, but are recognised in terms of Government policy, including planning and zonation (by the Isle of Man Strategic Plan) and agricultural policy (under Cross Compliance regulations). Wildlife Sites are shown on the MANNGIS Island Environment map.

Other Nature Reserves
Ballalough Reedbeds:  managed by Castletown Commissioners
Ballanette and Clay Head Brooghs: nature reserve, private but open to the public
Snaefell Valley: nature reserve, private but open to the public
Manx BirdLife Ayres National Reserve

Manx National Trust Landholdings
The following properties are under the protection of Manx National Heritage:
The Ayres
Ballaugh Curraghs
Eary Cushlin & Creggan Mooar
Dhoon and Bulgham Brooghs
Killabrega
Land seaward of the Marine Drive
Lower Silverdale
Maughold Head & Brooghs and Gob ny Rona
Niarbyl
Sound and the Calf of Man
Upper Ballaharry

Geology 

The majority of the island is formed from highly faulted and folded sedimentary rocks of the Ordovician period. There is a belt of younger Silurian rocks along the west coast between Niarbyl and Peel, and a small area of Devonian sandstones around Peel. A band of Carboniferous period rocks underlies part of the northern plain, but is nowhere seen at the surface; however similar age rocks do outcrop in the south between Castletown, Silverdale and Port St Mary. Permo-Triassic age rocks are known to lie beneath the Point of Ayre but, as with the rest of the northern plain, these rocks are concealed by substantial thicknesses of superficial deposits.

The island has significant deposits of copper, lead and silver, zinc, iron, and plumbago (a mix of graphite and clay). There are also quarries of black marble, limestone flags, clay schist, and granite. These are all modern, and there was no noticeable exploitation of metals or minerals prior to the modern era.

Demographics 

The island has a census-estimated population of 84,497 according to the most recent 2011 census: up from 79,805 in 2006 and 76,315 in 2001.

The island's largest town and administrative centre is Douglas, whose population is 23,000 — over a quarter of the population of the island. Neighbouring Onchan, Ramsey in the north, Peel in the west and the three southern ports of Castletown, Port Erin and Port St Mary are the island's other main settlements. Almost all its population lives on or very near the coast.

See also 
 Towns in the Isle of Man
 List of rivers of the Isle of Man
 Climate change and the Isle of Man

Citations

References